Iäti is thirteenth album by the Finnish rock group CMX. It was released in 2010, three years after the previous Talvikuningas. Compared to the previous album Iäti is more of a traditional rock album. It ranked first as most sold album on The Official Finnish Charts.

Iäti is last CMX album with drummer Tuomas Peippo.

Track listing
Songs by CMX. All lyrics by A. W. Yrjänä.

 "Sateenkaaren pää" – 3:40 (End of the Rainbow)
 "Kappaleina" – 3:24 (In Pieces)
 "Taistele" – 4:01 (Fight)
 "Auringon kultainen kaupunki" – 4:26 (The Golden City of the Sun)
 "Kuoleman kulkumies" – 3:52 (The Wanderer of Death)
 "Iäti" – 4:04 (Evermore)
 "Totenmann" – 4:52 
 "Manisola" – 3:38
 "Kättenpäällepanijat" – 4:07 (Those who lay hands on heads)
 "Linnunrata" – 4:52 (The Milky Way)
 "Laulu todellisuuden luonteesta" – 4.52 (Song about the nature of Reality)

Personnel

 A. W. Yrjänä – vocals, bass, acoustic guitar
 Janne Halmkrona – electric- and acoustic guitars, backing vocals
 Timo Rasio – electric- and acoustic guitars, bass, backing vocals
 Tuomas Peippo – drums, percussion

See also 
 CMX discography

References

External links
 http://www.cmx.fi/levyt/index.php?album=iati&type=album 

CMX (band) albums
2010 albums